Platismatia glauca is a common and widespread species of corticolous (bark-dwelling), foliose lichen in the family Parmeliaceae.

Taxonomy
It was first formally described by Carl Linnaeus in his 1753 work Species Plantarum. William and Chicita Culberson transferred it to the genus Platismatia in 1968.

Research
Platismatia glauca can acclimate to large variations in the availability of environmental nitrogen. It efficiently assimilates increased nitrogen into its thallus, increasing the size as well as the photosynthetic capabilities of its photobiont.

Chemistry
Several secondary metabolites have been isolated from the lichen, including the nor-triterpene ketone, 30-nor-21α-hopan-22-one, the depsides atranorin and chloroatranorin, and the aromatic compounds methyl β-orcinolcarboxylate and chloroatranol.

References

Parmeliaceae
Lichen species
Lichens described in 1753
Lichens of Africa
Lichens of Asia
Lichens of Europe
Lichens of North America
Taxa named by Carl Linnaeus